10 Arietis is a binary star system in the northern constellation of Aries. 10 Arietis is the Flamsteed designation. It is visible to the naked eye as a dim, yellow-white hued star with a combined apparent visual magnitude of 5.63. Based upon parallax measurements, it is located around 159 light years away from the Sun. The system is receding from the Earth with a heliocentric radial velocity of +12.9 km/s.

The pair orbit each other with a period of approximately 325 years and an eccentricity of 0.59. The magnitude 5.92 primary, designated component A, is an aging F-type subgiant star with a stellar classification of F8 IV. The secondary star, component B, is a magnitude 7.95 F-type main-sequence star with a stellar classification of F9 V. There is a magnitude 13.5 visual companion, designated component C, at an angular separation of  along a position angle of 150°, as of 2001.

References

External links
 HR 605 in the Bright Star Catalogue
 CCDM J02037+2556
 Image 10 Arietis

F-type main-sequence stars
F-type subgiants
Arietis, 10
Binary stars
Aries (constellation)
BD+25 0341
Arietis, 10
012558
009621
0605